Lascăr is both a Romanian surname and a masculine Romanian given name. Notable people with the name include:

 Bogdan Lascăr (born 1974), Romanian sculptor, graphic designer, and film maker
 Lascăr Catargiu (1823–1899), Romanian statesman
 Lascăr Vorel (1879—1918), Romanian Post-Impressionist painter
 Mihail Lascăr (1889–1959), Romanian General during World War II

See also
 Lascar (disambiguation)

Romanian-language surnames
Romanian masculine given names